Beech High School is one of two public high schools in Hendersonville, Tennessee. The school is located in the Shackle Island community on Long Hollow Pike, near the intersection of Shackle Island Road, Long Hollow Pike, and New Hope Road, just to the north of the Hendersonville city limits, and is part of the Sumner County Schools district. The current school officially opened on August 27, 1980, under the direction of Mr. Merroll N. Hyde. In 1986, the first female principal in Sumner County, Mary Clouse, became the principal. Frank Cardwell served as principal from 1999 until 2014, and was succeeded by Kenneth Powell.

The school's mascot is the Buccaneer, which is frequently shortened to "Buc." The school colors are officially white and orange; however, Navy blue is also popular.

A significant change occurred in the 2005–2006 school year when T.W. Hunter Middle School's new campus was completed. Beech relocated many of its ninth grade classes to the old T.W. Hunter building, now the high school's annex.

The school has a cross-town rivalry with Hendersonville High School, and the annual football game is usually a big event.

Beech softball holds four state titles, and the football team was the 2009 and 2012 Class 5A State Champion.

Football
Beech was the 2009 and 2012 Class 5A State Football Champion, winning the 2012 championship after going undefeated.

Academics
Classes at Beech follow either the standard, honors, or advanced placement level, excluding those in the fine arts and some other courses. The school has ACT test scores that are at or above state and national averages.

Clubs and activities
At Beech, there are many interests covered, providing a wide arrangement of activities students can pursue. Some of these include the BETA club, DECA, FBLA, Fellowship of Christian Athletes, FCCLA, FFA, HOSA, band, chorus, show choir, Visual Arts and Music for Society, NHS, NTHS, Noah's Promise/STARS, SkillsUSA, student council, yearbook, the Beech Breeze newspaper, Interact, Mock Trial, Young Politicians, and Venture Crew among others.

Beech has a marching band named the "Beech Buccaneer Brigade".

Beech is notable for its DECA, FFA, Beta, Interact Clubs, and Mock Trial. Both the DECA and Beta Clubs are perennial competitors and winners at the state and national level.

References

Sources
 
 https://web.archive.org/web/20110727221358/http://tssaa.org/schdir/Schdir_Detail.cfm?ID=19
 School board
 http://www.greatschools.net/modperl/achievement/tn/1446#from..Tab
 Football information

Public high schools in Tennessee
1980 establishments in Tennessee
Educational institutions established in 1980
Schools in Sumner County, Tennessee